(Nancy) Jane LeCompte (born  August 20, 1948 Eaton, Ohio) is an American writer of romance novels as Jane Ashford and Jane LeCompte. She lives in Cambridge, Massachusetts. She is a two-time nominee for a Career Achievement Award by Romantic Times BOOKreviews Magazine.

Bibliography

As Jane Ashford

Single novels
 Gwendeline 1980/01
 Bluestocking 1980/09
 Man of Honour 1981/03
 Rivals of Fortune 1981/10
 The Three Graces 1982/03
 The Marchington Scandal 1982/07
 The Headstrong Ward 1983/05
 A Radical Arrangement 1983/1
 First Season 1984/01
 Cachet 1984/06 reprint as First Impressions 1985/05
 The Impetuous Heiress 1984/06
 The Repentant Rebel 1984/10
 The Irresolute Rivals 1985/02
 Mirage 1986/10
 The Reluctant Rake 1987/05
 Meddlesome Miranda 1988/12
 The Marriage Wager 1996/10
 The Bargain 1997/09
 Charmed and Dangerous 1998/09
 Bride to Be 1999/08
 Once Again a Bride 2013/04

Omnibus In Collaboration
 Come November / Bluestocking / Hidden Spring (1980) (with Virginia Myers and Rose Swan)

As Jane LeCompte

Single novels
 Moon Passage 1989/01
 Sistren 2006/03

References and resources

External links
 Jane LeCompte Official Website
 Jane Ashford Official Website
 Jane Ashford's page at Fantastic Fiction
 Review of Moon Passage from The New York Times

20th-century American novelists
21st-century American novelists
American romantic fiction writers
American women novelists
Writers from Cambridge, Massachusetts
1948 births
Living people
Women romantic fiction writers
20th-century American women writers
21st-century American women writers
Novelists from Massachusetts
People from Eaton, Ohio